Florian Witulski (born 1986) is a German journalist and photographer based in Bangkok since 2008. His work is focused on Human rights and censorship in Thailand, Burma and Iran. He documented the violent protests between the National United Front of Democracy Against Dictatorship 'Red Shirts' and the government in the 2008-2010 Thai political crisis.
His work has appeared in several leading news channels, such as Aljazeera English, CNN International and France 24. He worked as the Asia correspondent of IHA's (Ihlas News Agency) bureau out of Bangkok until 2014 and is currently a freelance documentary film maker.

He is also involved in humanitarian work in several non-profit organizations in Laos and Burma.

References

External links 
 Witulski's Website
 Interview about the Thai Crisis, 2010, SPJ Network
 Video footage shown at the Foreign Correspondents Club of Thailand
 Twitter Reports during the Thai crisis, 2010, BoingBoing

German journalists
German male journalists
21st-century German photographers
Photography in Thailand
1986 births
Living people
German male writers
Date of birth missing (living people)